Sankaraguptam is a village in Malikipuram Mandal of Dr. B.R. Ambedkar Konaseema district, Andhra Pradesh, India. It is located in the delta region of Godavari known as Konaseema. Coconut, rice, and casuarina are the major crops grown. This is also the birth village of the legendary Carnatic musician M. Balamuralikrishna.

Etymology 
The name is said to be derived when Sankara hid here to protect himself from Bhashmasura who was blessed with boon by Lord Sankara that the head on which he places his palm would be burnt into ashes). Sankara refers to Lord Shiva and guptam is a secret, the place where Lord Shiva hid to protect himself from Bhasmasura.

Demographics 
According to Indian census, 2001 and 2011, the demographic details of this village are as follows:

References 

Villages in Konaseema district